The 2010 Misano Superbike World Championship round was the eighth round of the 2010 Superbike World Championship season. It took place on the weekend of June 25–27, 2010 at the Misano Adriatico circuit.

Results

Superbike race 1 classification

Superbike race 2 classification

Supersport race classification

References
 Superbike Race 1
 Superbike Race 2
 Supersport Race

Misano
Misano Superbike